Jake Walman (born February 20, 1996) is a Canadian-American professional ice hockey defenseman for the Detroit Red Wings of the National Hockey League (NHL). He was selected by the St. Louis Blues, 82nd overall, in the 2014 NHL Entry Draft.

Early life
Walman was born in Toronto, Ontario, Canada, and is Jewish. He holds American citizenship, through his mother Mary-Anne, a native of Providence, Rhode Island.

Playing career
Walman played junior hockey with the Toronto Jr. Canadiens in the Ontario Junior Hockey League (OJHL) before committing to collegiate hockey with Providence College of the Hockey East. Prior to his freshman season with the Friars, Walman was selected at the 2014 NHL Entry Draft in the third round, 82nd overall, by the St. Louis Blues.

On March 28, 2017, having completed his junior season with the Friars in 2016–17, Walman concluded his collegiate career early, signing a three-year, entry-level contract with the St. Louis Blues.

Walman made his NHL debut for the Blues during the 2019–20 season. In three seasons with the Blues he recorded four goals and four assists in 57 games.

On March 21, 2022, Walman was traded to the Detroit Red Wings, along with Oskar Sundqvist, and a second-round pick in 2023 NHL Entry Draft, in exchange for Nick Leddy and Luke Witkowski

On August 11, 2022, Walman as a restricted free agent was re-signed by the Red Wings to a one-year, $1.05 million contract extension for the  season. After opening the season on the injured-reserve, Walman returned and was given an increased role on the team, playing alongside Moritz Seider. Walman scored the overtime-winning goal for the Red Wings on December 28 against the Pittsburgh Penguins, during which Detroit initially trailed by a 4-0 score. He subsequently went viral for celebrating with the Griddy dance. On 28 February 2023, Walman was re-signed to a three-year, $10.2 million contract extension with the Red Wings.

International play
Walman, a dual citizen who exclusively trained in the Canadian hockey system attended the training camp for the United States men's national junior ice hockey team in preparation for the 2016 World Junior Ice Hockey Championships.

Despite being considered a lock to make the team, Walman wasn’t eligible to play for the Americans, despite living in Providence, Rhode Island for 16 months due to not meeting the IIHF’s requirement of playing two consecutive seasons in the country in order to play for the national team, as he was in the midst of his second season playing in the United States.

USA Hockey attempted to appeal the ruling, which was denied by the IIHF. Following the ruling, Walman was invited to the Canadian men’s national junior ice hockey team’s selection camp, but did not make the final roster.

Career statistics

Awards and honours

See also
List of select Jewish ice hockey players

References

External links
 

1996 births
Living people
Binghamton Devils players
Canadian ice hockey defencemen
Chicago Wolves players
Detroit Red Wings players
Jewish ice hockey players
Providence Friars men's ice hockey players
St. Louis Blues draft picks
St. Louis Blues players
San Antonio Rampage players
Ice hockey people from Toronto
AHCA Division I men's ice hockey All-Americans